Vojislav Vezović (born 19 November 1948) is a Serbian former professional basketball coach and player.

Early life and playing career 
Vezović was born in Belgrade, PR Serbia, Yugoslavia. In Belgrade, he graduated from Ivan Goran Kovačić Elementary School and Sixth Belgrade Gymnasium. In 1962, he started to play basketball and grew up with Crvena Zvezda youth teams. Vezović played senior basketball in Crvena zvezda's affiliations: KK Kalemegdan and KK Voždovac. He ended his playing career in 1974.

Coaching career 
Vezović was a head coach for the Nigeria women's national team that won the bronze medal at the 1978 All-Africa Games in Algeria. He also coached teams in Greece (Apollon Patras, Iraklio, Maroussi, and Ilysiakos), Cyprus (ENAD Nicosia and Olimpiada Nicosia), Qatar (Al Rayyan), and Poland (MKS Pruszków).

References

1948 births
Living people
Apollon Patras B.C. coaches
Basketball players from Belgrade
Ilysiakos B.C. coaches
Irakleio B.C. coaches
KK Beopetrol/Atlas Beograd coaches
KK Crvena zvezda youth coaches
KK Crvena zvezda youth players
KK Radnički Kragujevac (1950–2004) coaches
KK Sloboda Tuzla coaches
KK Zastava coaches
Maroussi B.C. coaches
OKK Beograd coaches
KK Šibenik coaches
Serbian expatriate basketball people in Bosnia and Herzegovina
Serbian expatriate basketball people in Croatia
Serbian expatriate basketball people in Cyprus
Serbian expatriate basketball people in Greece
Serbian expatriate basketball people in Morocco
Serbian expatriate basketball people in Nigeria
Serbian expatriate basketball people in Poland
Serbian expatriate basketball people in Qatar
Serbian men's basketball coaches
Serbian men's basketball players
Yugoslav basketball coaches
Yugoslav men's basketball players